Aayirathil Oruvan may refer to:
 Aayirathil Oruvan (1965 film), a Tamil film directed by B. R. Panthulu
 Aayirathil Oruvan (2009 film), a Malayalam film directed by Sibi Malayil
 Aayirathil Oruvan (2010 film), a Tamil film directed by Selvaraghavan